Jong-Kwon Baek (Hangul: 백종권, Hanja: 白鐘権) (born November 7, 1971 in Jinju, Gyeongsangnam-do, South Korea) is a former boxer from South Korea.

Professional boxing career
On October 31, 1999, Baek defeated Lakva Sim by split decision to win the WBA super featherweight championship.

He made his first title defense against fellow South Korean Kyu Chul Choi on January 30, 2000, with the fight ending in a split draw after 12 rounds.

Baek lost the WBA super featherweight title to Cuban boxer Joel Casamayor on May 21, 2000, losing by fifth-round technical knockout.

He finished his professional boxing career with a record of 23 wins (20 knockouts), 1 loss, and 1 draw.

Professional boxing record

References

External links
 

1971 births
Super-featherweight boxers
World Boxing Association champions
World super-featherweight boxing champions
Living people
South Korean male boxers
People from Jinju
Sportspeople from South Gyeongsang Province